Zenonia zeno, the orange-spotted skipper, orange-spotted bellboy or common bellboy, is a butterfly of the family Hesperiidae. It is found from KwaZulu-Natal, Transvaal, Zimbabwe and Mozambique to eastern Africa and to Nigeria. The habitat consists of forests and coastal bush.

Adults are brown with extensive orange markings. The whole of the forewing cell and the hindwing discal band are orange. Adults are on wing year round. Both sexes are attracted to flowers.

Larvae feed on various grasses, but also on Gramineae species, including cultivated maize and sorghums.

References

Hesperiinae
Butterflies of Africa
Lepidoptera of Mozambique
Lepidoptera of West Africa
Lepidoptera of South Africa
Lepidoptera of Zimbabwe
Butterflies described in 1864
Taxa named by Roland Trimen